Eugenijus Petrovas (born 26 April 1936 in Leningrad) is a Lithuanian politician. In 1990 he was among those who signed the Act of the Re-Establishment of the State of Lithuania.

External links
 Biography 

1936 births
Living people
20th-century Lithuanian politicians
Politicians from Saint Petersburg
Šiauliai Pedagogical Institute alumni